The Women's fraction is a cross-factional all-female parliamentary group in the Iranian Parliament which advocates Women's rights in Iran.

History 
In 1996, a commission was established for Women, Youth and Family Affairs in the Parliament, headed by Marzieh Vahid-Dastjerdi. However, it included some male members. In 2000, female representatives created a fraction designated for women.

Historical membership 
Iran's female members of parliament have always been few in number.

See also 
 List of female members of the Islamic Consultative Assembly
 List of female members of the Cabinet of Iran

References 

 
Iranian Parliament fractions
2000 establishments in Iran